Medstead and Four Marks railway station is a railway station in the English county of Hampshire, serving the villages of Medstead and Four Marks. At 644 ft above sea level, it is currently (2016) the highest operational standard-gauge railway station in Southern England.

History

Opened in August 1868 as Medstead, it changed to its present name on 1 October 1937.
The passing loop was removed, signal box closed and station destaffed in January 1967. It closed in 1973.

Preservation

It was reopened on 28 May 1983 by the preserved Watercress Line, which runs from Alton to New Alresford. The footbridge (currently on the country end) is from Cowes railway station on the Isle of Wight. The signal box came from Wilton South. Beside the station is the Signal and Telegraph department, which also houses the Permanent Way Gang and the Building Department.

Route

References

Heritage railway stations in Hampshire
Former London and South Western Railway stations
Railway stations in Great Britain opened in 1868
Railway stations in Great Britain closed in 1973
Beeching closures in England
Railway stations in Great Britain opened in 1983
1868 establishments in England
1973 disestablishments in England
1983 establishments in England